Adesmia elegans is a species of legumes. It is found in Chile.

References

External links 

 Adesmia elegans at Tropicos

elegans
Plants described in 1846
Flora of Chile